Kiçik Qaramurad (also, Kichik Karamurad) is a village and municipality in the Gadabay Rayon of Azerbaijan.  It has a population of 1,466.  The municipality consists of the villages of Kiçik Qaramurad and Leşkər.

References 

Populated places in Gadabay District